Andrea Maestrelli (born 23 February 1998) is an Italian football player.

Club career
He made his Serie C debut for Arzachena on 7 October 2017 in a game against Gavorrano.

On 8 July 2019, he signed with Arezzo. On 2 September 2019, he was loaned to Monopoli.

On 3 February 2021, he moved to Lucchese.

References

External links
 

1998 births
Footballers from Rome
Living people
Italian footballers
Association football defenders
A.C. Perugia Calcio players
S.S. Arezzo players
S.S. Monopoli 1966 players
S.S.D. Lucchese 1905 players
Potenza Calcio players
Serie C players